Ujjain airstrip  is a public airstrip owned by the Government of Madhya Pradesh located at Ujjain, Madhya Pradesh. The nearest airport/airstrip to this airport is Devi Ahilyabai Holkar International Airport in Indore.

In 2013, Government of Madhya Pradesh started a Ujjain-Bhopal air services as a joint venture with Ventura Airconnect. Due to very low booking, the ambitious project was scrapped. The main reason for the failure of the plan was improper timing. The nine seating capacity aircraft was into service.

References

Defunct airports in India
Airports in Madhya Pradesh
Ujjain
 
Buildings and structures in Ujjain
Transport in Ujjain
Year of establishment missing